The Alamo Navajo Indian Reservation is a non-contiguous section of the Navajo Nation lying in northwestern Socorro County, New Mexico, United States, adjacent to the southeastern part of the Acoma Indian Reservation. It has a land area of 256.616 km² (99.08 sq mi), and a 2000 census resident population of almost 2,000 persons. The Alamo Band of the Navajo Nation Reservation's land area is only about four-tenths of one percent of the Navajo Nation's total area. The remote community has a K-12 school (Alamo Navajo School Board), Early Childhood Center, Wellness Center, a Community Service center that provides school and non-school related programs, a state-of-the-art Health Center and KABR radio, 1500 AM.

References
Alamo Navajo Reservation (Tribal Census Tracts 9415 and 9461), Navajo Reservation and Off-Reservation Trust Land, Arizona/New Mexico/Utah United States Census Bureau

External links
 Alamo Navajo School Board Home Page
 Navajo Chapters: Alamo Web Page
 Alamo Navajo School Board

Geography of the Navajo Nation
Native American tribes in New Mexico
Populated places in Socorro County, New Mexico